Their Night Out is a 1933 British comedy film directed by Harry Hughes and starring Claude Hulbert, Renee Houston and Gus McNaughton. It was made by British International Pictures at Elstree Studios. The film's sets were designed by the art director Duncan Sutherland.

Cast
 Claude Hulbert as Jimmy Oliphant 
 Renee Houston as Maggie Oliphant 
 Gus McNaughton as Fred Simpson 
 Binnie Barnes as Lola 
 Jimmy Godden as Archibald Bunting 
 Amy Veness as Gertrude Bunting 
 Judy Kelly as Betty Oliphant 
 Ben Welden as Crook 
 Hal Gordon as Sgt. Bert Simpson 
 Marie Ault as Cook

References

Bibliography
 Low, Rachael. Filmmaking in 1930s Britain. George Allen & Unwin, 1985.
Wood, Linda. British Films, 1927–1939. British Film Institute, 1986.

External links

1933 films
1933 comedy films
British comedy films
Films shot at British International Pictures Studios
Films directed by Harry Hughes
British black-and-white films
1930s English-language films
1930s British films